The Treaty of Heiligen was signed in 811 between the Danish King Hemming and Charlemagne. Based on the terms of the accord, the southern boundary of Denmark was established at the Eider River. Moreover, the treaty confirmed the peace established by both signatories in 810.

Since the days of King Offa the Eider river had been the border between the settlement area of the Angles and Saxons. After Charlemagne had subjected the Duchy of Saxony to his rule, Hemming's predecessor and uncle Gudfred took the chance, crossed the Eider and campaigned in the southern lands, which Charles had left to the allied Obotrites. The king however was killed by his retinue in 810 and Hemming, to assure his rule against his rivaling cousins, sought peace with the Franks. His and the Emperor's negotiators met on an island of the Eider in present-day Rendsburg and defined the limits of their spheres of influence.

Though in the following decades several quarrels occurred in the border area and the German King Henry I conquered Danish Hedeby at the Danevirke in 934, the border was confirmed by Canute the Great and King Conrad II in 1025 at the betrothal of their children Gunhilda and Henry III. For centuries the Eider marked the border between the Danish Duchy of Schleswig and the German County of Holstein, but these came to be united under one ruler and proclaimed indivisible, which caused the Eider boundary to become disputed in the 19th century. This dispute was finally settled after World War I: The Danish-German border which had been moved north to the Kongeå after the Prussian-Austrian conquest in 1864 was relocated south to its present location between Kongeå and Eider. The southern, German part of Schleswig was by then mostly German-speaking and identifying as German and remained part of the Province of Schleswig-Holstein.

References

Sources

External links 

History of Denmark
A Brief History of Denmark

Heiligen
Heiligen
9th century in Europe
Heiligen
Charlemagne
811
Military history of the Carolingian Empire
History of Schleswig-Holstein